The 2002 Campionati Internazionali di Sicilia was a men's tennis tournament played on outdoor clay courts in Palermo, Italy and was part of the International Series of the 2002 ATP Tour. It was the 24th edition of the tournament and ran from 23 September until 29 September 2002. Second-seeded Fernando González won the singles title.

Finals

Singles

 Fernando González defeated  José Acasuso 5–7, 6–3, 6–1
 It was González's 2nd singles title of the year and the 3rd of his career.

Doubles

 Lucas Arnold /  Luis Lobo defeated  František Čermák /  Leoš Friedl 6–4, 4–6, 6–2
 It was Arnold's only title of the year and the 9th of his career. It was Lobo's only title of the year and the 12th of his career.

References

External links
 ITF tournament edition details

Campionati Internazionali di Sicilia
Campionati Internazionali di Sicilia
Campionati Internazionali di Sicilia
Campionati Internazionali di Sicilia